Robert David Proctor (born December 5, 1960) is a United States district judge of the United States District Court for the Northern District of Alabama.

Education and career

Born in Atlanta, Georgia, Proctor received a Bachelor of Arts degree from Carson–Newman College, (now Carson–Newman University), in 1983 and a Juris Doctor from the University of Tennessee College of Law in 1986. He was a law clerk to H. Emory Widener Jr. of the U.S. Court of Appeals for the Fourth Circuit from 1986 to 1987. He was in private practice in Birmingham, Alabama, from 1987 to 2003.

Federal judicial service

On May 1, 2003, Proctor was nominated by President George W. Bush to a new seat on the United States District Court for the Northern District of Alabama created by 116 Stat. 1758. He was confirmed by the United States Senate on September 17, 2003, and received his commission on September 22, 2003.

Sources

1960 births
Living people
Judges of the United States District Court for the Northern District of Alabama
United States district court judges appointed by George W. Bush
21st-century American judges
Carson–Newman University alumni
University of Tennessee College of Law alumni
People from Atlanta